An acidophile is an organism that thrives under highly acidic conditions.

Acidophile may also refer to:

 Acidophile (histology), a particular staining pattern of cells and tissues when using haematoxylin and eosin stains

See also
Acidofilia, 2002 album by Acid Drinkers
Acidophil cell in the anterior pituitary
Lactobacillus acidophilus, a species of bacteria
Acidophobe, antonym of acidophile